Helix obruta is a species of large, edible, air-breathing land snail, a terrestrial pulmonate gastropod mollusk in the family Helicidae, which is the typical snail family. This species is endemic to Portugal.

References

Molluscs of the Azores
Helix (gastropod)
Gastropods described in 1860
Taxonomy articles created by Polbot
Taxobox binomials not recognized by IUCN